Kislino is a rural locality (a khutor) in Ryshkovsky Selsoviet Rural Settlement, Kursky District, Kursk Oblast, Russia. Population:

Geography 
The khutor is located in the Seym River basin (a left tributary of the Desna), 83 km from the Russia–Ukraine border, at the southern border of Kursk, 3 km from the selsoviet center – Ryshkovo.

 Streets
There are the following streets in the locality: pereulok 1-y Lermontova, pereulok 2-oy Lermontova, 8 marta, Akhmatovoy, Arkticheskaya, Avangardnaya, Begovaya, Beryozovaya, Bezymyannaya, Blagopoluchnaya, Bumazhnaya, Chekhova, Donskaya, Feta, Fruktovaya, Gagarina, Gogolya, Goncharnaya, Gorokhovaya, Granitnaya, Izumrudnaya, Kazanskaya, Kalinina, Kirpichnaya, Kolkhoznaya, Kompleksnaya, Kosmonavtov, Lenina, Lermontova, Lesnaya, Lva Tolstogo, Lyubimaya, Masterovaya, Mayakovskogo, Mirnaya, Narodnaya, Nekrasova, Novaya, Olkhovaya, pereulok Ostrovskogo, Pesochnaya, Pobedy, Polevaya, Progonnaya, Prostornaya, Pushkina, Sadovaya, Slavyanskaya, Sovetskaya, Schastlivaya, Svetlaya, Svobodnaya, Tikhaya, Tsvetayevoy, Tsentralnaya, Tulskaya, Udachnaya, Uspeshnaya, Varshavskaya, Vatutina, Vesyolaya, Vishnyovaya, Vostochnaya, Voznesenskaya, Yeliseyeva, Yesenina, Yuzhnaya, Zapovednaya, Zelyonaya and Zhukovskogo (1535 houses).

 Climate
Kislino has a warm-summer humid continental climate (Dfb in the Köppen climate classification).

Transport 
Kislino is located 2 km from the road of intermunicipal significance  (Kursk – Petrin), on the road  (38H-416 – Kislino – Kukuyevka), 2 km from the nearest railway station Ryshkovo (railway line Lgov I — Kursk).

The rural locality is situated 15 km from Kursk Vostochny Airport, 112 km from Belgorod International Airport and 214 km from Voronezh Peter the Great Airport.

References

Notes

Sources

Rural localities in Kursky District, Kursk Oblast